The Pumhart von Steyr is a medieval large-calibre cannon from Styria, Austria, and the largest known wrought-iron bombard by caliber. It weighs around 8 tons and has a length of more than 2.5 meters. It was produced in the early 15th century and could fire, according to modern calculations, an 80 cm stone ball weighing 690 kg to a distance of roughly 600 m after being loaded with 15 kg of gunpowder and set at an elevation of 10°.

The bombard is today on display in one of the artillery halls of the Heeresgeschichtliches Museum at Vienna.

Besides the Pumhart von Steyr, a number of 15th-century European large-calibre weapons are known to have been employed primarily in siege warfare, including the wrought-iron Mons Meg and Dulle Griet as well as the cast-bronze Faule Mette, Faule Grete and Grose Bochse.

Footnotes

See also 
 List of the largest cannon by caliber

References

Further reading

External links 

800 mm artillery
Individual cannons
Medieval artillery